Dayang Island is an island in Mersing District, Johor, Malaysia. It is one of a group of islands along with Pulau Aur, Pulau Lang, and Pulau Pemanggil. The name of the neighbouring island, Pulau Aur, means "bamboo island" in Malay. Both islands have been known to Chinese sailors for centuries. A map from the 17th century identified these islands as East and West Bamboo islands.

This is a small island with two resorts available. Being the furthest island in West Malaysia, it takes a while to get to, three to four hours by charter boat from Mersing town. Dayang and Aur islands can be visited from March to November. Travel from December to February is not recommended, when the sea is controlled by the northeast monsoon and navigation from the main coast of Malaysia is generally closed.

See also
 List of islands of Malaysia

References 

Islands of Johor
Mersing District